The Legend of Drizzt is a series of fantasy novels by R. A. Salvatore that began in 1988, and consists of 38 books as of August 9, 2022. They are based in the Forgotten Realms setting in the dimension of Abeir-Toril on the continent Faerûn in the popular D&D universe currently published/owned by Wizards of the Coast. It combines the series The Dark Elf Trilogy, The Icewind Dale Trilogy, Legacy of the Drow, Paths of Darkness, The Hunter's Blades Trilogy, and other sets into an abridged compilation. Drizzt Do'Urden is the main character of most of the books.

Main titles
This series includes re-issues of novels (with new cover art) that had previously been published under different series titles.  In this list, they are numbered not in the order of their original publication, but rather in their chronological order in Drizzt's life.  The first six novels in this series had never previously been released in a hardcover edition. Note: The Hunter's Blades Trilogy has not been re-issued as part of the Legend of Drizzt series, but later releases have been considered as such.

Short stories

Also released was a set of classic short stories that expanded the character's legacy, in an anthology titled The Collected Stories: The Legend of Drizzt. It includes the following short stories:
 "The First Notch"
 "Dark Mirror"
 "The Third Level"
 "Guenhwyvar"
 "That Curious Sword"
 "Wickless in the Nether"
 "The Dowery"
 "Comrades at Odds"
 "If They Ever Happened Upon My Lair"
 "Bones and Stones"
 "Iruladoon"
 "To Legend He Goes"

Furthermore, several portions of the entire series have been reprinted in boxed sets:
 The Legend of Drizzt Boxed Set, Books I-III (containing Homeland, Exile, and Sojourn)
 The Legend of Drizzt Boxed Set, Books IV-VI (containing The Crystal Shard, Streams of Silver, and The Halfling's Gem)
 The Legend of Drizzt Boxed Set, Books VII-X (containing The Legacy, Starless Night, Siege of Darkness, and Passage to Dawn)
 The Legend of Drizzt Boxed Set, Books XI-XIII (containing The Silent Blade, The Spine of the World, and The Sea of Swords)
 The Hunter's Blades Trilogy (containing Books XIV-XVI: The Thousand Orcs, The Lone Drow, and The Two Swords)
 Transitions (containing Books XVII-XIX: The Orc King, The Pirate King, and The Ghost King)

Portions of the entire series have been reprinted in single-book collector's edition:
 The Legend of Drizzt Collector's Edition, Book I (containing Homeland, Exile, and Sojourn)
 The Legend of Drizzt Collector's Edition, Book II (containing The Crystal Shard, Streams of Silver, and The Halfling's Gem)
 The Legend of Drizzt Collector's Edition, Book III (containing The Legacy, Starless Night, Siege of Darkness, and Passage to Dawn)
 The Legend of Drizzt Collector's Edition, Book IV (containing The Silent Blade, The Spine of the World, and The Sea of Swords)

References

Book series introduced in 1988
Fantasy novel series
Forgotten Realms novel series